Sacré Blues: An Unsentimental Journey Through Quebec  is a non-fiction book, written by Canadian writer Taras Grescoe, first published in 2000 by Macfarlane Walter & Ross. In the book, the author narrates his candid recollections of moving to Quebec in 1996. In describing "the rituals, eccentricities and customs of his new home", Kathryn Wardropper, award administrator for the Edna Staebler Award said, "It may infuriate some, but it is a landmark book that portrays the challenges and opportunities for modern Quebec."

Awards

See also
List of Edna Staebler Award recipients

References

External links
Taras Grescoe, Home page, Retrieved 11/26/2012

Canadian non-fiction books
2000 non-fiction books
Books about Quebec